Henry George Watson (13 June 1904 – 25 December 1996) was the first New Zealander to ride in the Tour de France. In 1928, he teamed up with Australian cyclists, Hubert Opperman, Percy Osborn and Ernie Bainbridge. They were the first English-speaking team to ride the Tour de France.

Early life and family
Watson was born in 1904. His parents were George and Elsie Watson, who farmed on the Canterbury Plains. He was the oldest of four children; the next oldest was his brother Arthur, and the two youngest were sisters Gladys and Joy. The family shifted to Marshland on the northern outskirts of Christchurch to become market gardeners. There, they were neighbours with the Arnst family, who were equally sports-mad as all the Watson children. Jack Arnst (born 1883) was a champion cyclist, and his twin Richard "Dick" Arnst was a world champion rower. On 7 September 1926, Harry Watson married his neighbour Catherine Margaret "Kitty" Arnst (born 1905) at St Matthew's Church in St Albans. Her father, Charles William Arnst (born 1880), was an elder brother to Jack and Dick.

Cycling career
There were 22 stages, ranging from 119 kilometres to 387 kilometres. As the Australasians were relatively inexperienced (they had never raced in Europe before) and were a trade team of four competing against teams of 8 to 10 cyclists, the French media predicted they would only last a few stages before pulling out. Of the 168 starters that year, only 41 finished. Watson placed 28th. He stated afterwards that it was the toughest race he had ever completed: "When I think of the mountain climbing, the mad rushes downhill, and the riding at night in pitch darkness, well, it is a veritable nightmare! In spite of this, it was a wonderful experience racing the Continentals."

After eight months abroad Watson returned to New Zealand and continued competitive cycling to 1937. He won almost every long distance race that he entered, and set some enduring records in the process. The most notable was in 1935 when he completed the 167-kilometre Taranaki Around-the-Mountain Road Race in 4 hours, 8 minutes, 38 seconds (average speed of 40 km/h).

Watson was selected for the 1928 Tour de France on the strength of his performance in the Dunlop Grand Prix, which at the time was the biggest cycling race in the British Empire and the richest race in the world. The race was held in four stages around Victoria in  November 1927, covering .  The Dunlop Grand Prix carried with it the title of Long Distance Road Champion of Australasia and Watson finished second to Opperman.

Watson returned to Australia in 1934 for the Centenary 1000 a one-week race over seven stages covering  to mark the Centenary of Victoria, a race which also carried the title of Long Distance Road Champion of Australasia.

Le Ride
In July 2013, The Amazing Race host Phil Keoghan paid homage to Watson and the other riders of the 1928 Tour de France by retracing the ride route on bikes of the era. His journey was filmed for a documentary, Le Ride, and also served as a fund-raiser for multiple sclerosis research.

Notes

References

External links

1928 photo of Watson

New Zealand male cyclists
1904 births
1996 deaths
Place of birth missing